Josef Haslinger (born July 5, 1955) is an Austrian writer.

Haslinger was born in Zwettl, Lower Austria. He studied philosophy, drama and Germanic studies at the University of Vienna. He received his PhD in 1980. Since then he has been working as a freelance writer. 1976 to 1992 he was co-editor of the literary magazine "Wespennest".

In 1983/84 Haslinger had a teaching position at the University of Kassel, was Secretary General of the Graz Authors' Assembly from 1986 to 1989, and from 1986 to 1994 co-organizer of the "Vienna Lectures on Literature". In 1995 he was a lecturer at the University of Kassel and wrote parts of his political thriller novel, Opernball (Opera Ball) there.

Haslinger has taught since 1996 as a professor of literary aesthetics at the German Literature Institute in Leipzig. He lives Vienna und Leipzig.

Awards and honors
 1980 Theodor Körner Prize
 1982 Österreichisches Staatsstipendium für Literatur
 1984 Förderungspreis der Stadt Wien
 1985 Stipendium des Deutschen Literaturfonds
 1988 Österreichisches Dramatikerstipendium
 1993–94 Elias Canetti-Stipendium der Stadt Wien
 1994 Stipendium des Deutschen Literaturfonds
 1994 Förderungspreis des Landes Niederösterreich für Literatur
 1996 New-York-Stipendium des Deutschen Literaturfonds
 2000 Literaturpreis der Stadt Wien
 2000 Ehrenpreis des österreichischen Buchhandels für Toleranz in Denken und Handeln
 2010 Mainzer Stadtschreiber
 2011 Rheingau Literatur Preis

Works

Prose 
 Der Konviktskaktus (Erzählungen) (1980)
 Der Rauch im Wald (1981)
 Hugo Sonnenschein (1984)
 Der Tod des Kleinhäuslers Ignaz Hajek (Novelle) (1985)
 Opernball (1995)
 Das Vaterspiel (2000)
 Zugvögel. Erzählungen. S. Fischer Verlag  (2006)
 Phi Phi Island. Ein Bericht. S. Fischer Verlag  (2007)

Essays 
 Die Ästhetik des Novalis (1981)
 Politik der Gefühle – Ein Essay über Österreich (1987). Fischer-Verlag 
 Wozu brauchen wir Atlantis (1990)
 Das Elend Amerikas. 11 Versuche über ein gelobtes Land (1992)
 Hausdurchsuchungen im Elfenbeinturm (1996)
 Klasse Burschen (2001)
 Am Ende der Sprachkultur? Über das Schicksal von Schreiben, Sprechen und Lesen. (Wiener Karl Kraus Vorlesungen zur Kulturkritik, Band 1),  (2003)

Editor 
 Wie werde ich ein verdammt guter Schriftsteller? Berichte aus der Werkstatt, Hg. zus. mit Hans-Ulrich Treichel. Frankfurt/Main: Suhrkamp, 2005. TB 
 Schreiben lernen – Schreiben lehren, Hg. zus. mit Hans-Ulrich Treichel. Frankfurt/Main: Fischer, 2006. TB

External links 
Josef Haslinger Lecture: Narrating Integration: One Story at a Time – European Union Center at the University of Illinois, Urbana-Champaign.

References 

1955 births
Living people
20th-century Austrian novelists
21st-century Austrian novelists
20th-century Austrian male writers
21st-century Austrian male writers
People from Zwettl
Academic staff of the University of Kassel
Austrian male novelists
Austrian essayists
Male essayists
International Writing Program alumni
20th-century essayists
21st-century essayists
21st-century male writers